The Belles-Dames (also known as the Orne) is a small river in the Corrèze and Dordogne departments of southwestern France. It is a tributary of the river Auvézère, which is part of the Dordogne basin. Its source is near Beyssenac, and it flows into the Auvézère near Payzac.

See also
 List of rivers of France

References 

Rivers of France
Rivers of Nouvelle-Aquitaine
Rivers of Dordogne